Chhipabarod is a census town in Baran district in the state of Rajasthan, India.

Demographics
 India census, Chhipabarod had a population of 16,026. Males constitute 51% of the population and females 49%. Chhipabarod has an average literacy rate of 62%, higher than the national average of 59.5%; with male literacy of 73% and female literacy of 50%. 18% of the population is under 6 years of age.

Transportation
The town is connected with neighbouring districts and with major cities outside the state. State Highway No. 37A passes through the town. The nearest railway stations are Chhabra Gugor Railway station (17 km away) and Salpura Railway Station (17 km). The major railway station is Kota Junction (138 km). The town has a bus stand. The nearest major airports are Jaipur International Airport, Udaipur Airport, and Jodhpur Airport. These airports connect Rajasthan with the major cities of India such as Delhi and Mumbai.

Education
The town has good educational resources and infrastructure including some schools and one college. Schools are generally affiliated to Board of Secondary Education, Rajasthan.

Government 
 Government E Mitra GLG Computers
 Government Primary School
 Daanmal Senior Secondary School
 Government Girls School

Private Schools
pragya secondary school
MAHESHWARI PUBLIC SCHOOL
DR.S.R.K.ENGLISH ACADEMY
 Sushila Devi Aadarsh Vidya Mandir
 Seva Bharti Senior Secondary School
 MJF Senior Secondary School
 Shri Agrasen Senior Secondary School
 Laxmi Chand Goyal School
 Radhakrishna English Academy
 Barat Bhal Vidhya Mandhir School
 U.P.S. Dhamniya
 Kushwah bal niketan sec School chhipabarod
sankskar vidya mandir school chhipabarod

References

Cities and towns in Baran district

 यहां लहसुन मंडी स्थित है